Al-Fayhaa Sports Complex, is a football training facility opened in 1976, serving as the headquarters of the Syrian Arab Federation for Football as well as the official training centre of the Syrian football team. It is located in the municipal district of al-Salihiyah at the heart of Damascus, the capital of Syria.

Overview
Occupying and area of 250,000 m², al-Fayhaa Sports Complex was opened in 1976 to host the 5th Pan Arab Games of 1976.

The complex is home to the following facilities:
Al-Fayhaa Stadium, is the main football stadium of the complex, able to hold up to 12,000 spectators.
Regular-sized training pitch with natural grass.
Regular-sized training pitch with artificial turf.
2 seven-a-side football training fields with natural grass.
2 five-a-side football training fields with artificial turf.
6 outdoor tennis courts.
Olympic swimming and diving complex, and indoor swimming pool.
Al-Fayhaa Sports Arena, for basketball, handball and volleyball, with a seating capacity of 6,000 spectators.
5 indoor training halls for several sports.
Athletes' residence and hotel.
The ball-shaped building of the Syrian Arab Federation for Football.

References

Fayhaa
Fayhaa
National football academies